Imagine Tap! is a musical revue developed by Derick K. Grant (director/choreographer), Zane Mark (music director/supervisor), Aaron Tolson (associate choreographer/co-creator/asst producer), and Channing Cook Holmes (assistant music director).  It opened at the Harris Theater for Music and Dance in Chicago, IL on July 11, 2006 and closed on August 6, 2006.  

This show is unique because it is one of the few big-budget all-tap dance revues since Bring in 'da Noise/Bring in 'da Funk, of which Derick K. Grant was dance captain for the original Broadway cast.

List of songs
All original music is by Zane Mark and Crystal Joy.
 Imagine Tap
 Echoes
 3 Chefs
 Mr. Happy
 Beautiful Love
 Tea 4 Two
 The Doll
 Tea 4 Two [B]
 Detention
 Dance Like David
 Tu Eres Loco
 Subway Heat
 Samurai Shuffle
 Battle of the Beats
 Old Friends
 Imagine Tap (reprise)

External links
 Official Imagine Tap! Website
 Unofficial Imagine Tap! Myspace Account
 
 
 Dance View Times article
 Windy City Times article
 CNN article

2006 musicals